Clidophleps distanti is a species of cicada in the family Cicadidae. It is found in Central America and North America.

Subspecies
These two subspecies belong to the species Clidophleps distanti:
 Clidophleps distanti distanti (Van Duzee, 1914)
 Clidophleps distanti truncata (Van Duzee, 1914)

References

Further reading

 

Articles created by Qbugbot
Insects described in 1914
Tibicinini